Hazel Bryan Massery (born 31 January 1942) was a student at Little Rock Central High School during the Civil Rights Movement. She was depicted in an iconic photograph made by photojournalist Will Counts showing her shouting at Elizabeth Eckford, one of the Little Rock Nine, during the Little Rock Crisis.

Little Rock High School
On September 4, 1957, nine African-American students entered Little Rock Central High School as the school's first black students, including Elizabeth Eckford. On her way to the school, a group of white teenage girls followed Eckford, chanting "Two, four, six, eight! We don't want to integrate!" One of these girls was Hazel Bryan. Benjamin Fine of The New York Times later described her as "screaming, just hysterical, just like one of these Elvis Presley hysterical deals, where these kids are fainting with hysteria." Bryan is also credited as shouting, "Go home, nigger! Go back to Africa!"

After the photo became public, Hazel started to receive "critical" mail, mostly from the North. Author David Margolick wrote that while Hazel only found the criticism "surprising", "Hazel's parents found her sudden notoriety sufficiently alarming to pull her out of the school."

Bryan left her new school when she was 17, married Antoine Massery and began a family. After that, her attitude toward Martin Luther King Jr. and the concept of desegregation changed. "Hazel Bryan Massery was curious, and reflective... One day, she realized, her children would learn that the snarling girl in their history books was their mother. She realized she had an account to settle."

In 1963, having changed her mind on integration and feeling guilt for her treatment of Eckford, Bryan contacted Eckford to apologize. They went their separate ways after this first meeting, and Eckford did not name the girl in the picture when asked about it by reporters.

During the time after Little Rock, Hazel had become increasingly political, branching out into peace activism and social work. David Margolick discovered, "She taught mothering skills to unmarried black women, and took underprivileged black teenagers on field trips. She frequented the black history section at the local Barnes & Noble, buying books by Cornel West and Shelby Steele and the companion volume to Eyes on the Prize."

Bryan hoped her reputation could be gained back, but this did not happen until the 40th anniversary of Central's desegregation in 1997. Will Counts, the journalist who took the famous picture, arranged for Elizabeth and Hazel to meet again. The reunion provided an opportunity for acts of reconciliation, as noted in this editorial from the Arkansas Democrat-Gazette on the first day of 1998:

Friendship with Elizabeth Eckford 
Despite feeling awkward when they first met, Eckford and Bryan surprisingly became friends afterwards:

Soon after, the friendship began to fray. In 1999, David Margolick travelled to Little Rock and arranged to meet Elizabeth and Hazel. According to Hazel Bryan, she said, "I think she still… at times we have a little… well, the honeymoon is over and now we're getting to take out the garbage." Eckford began to believe Bryan "wanted me to be cured and be over it and for this not to go on... She wanted me to be less uncomfortable so that she wouldn't feel responsible anymore." The other eight of the Little Rock Nine did not want this friendship to last any longer. The friendship quietly dissolved in 1999, when Elizabeth Eckford wrote "True reconciliation can occur only when we honestly acknowledge our painful, but shared, past" on the brick of Central High. This message affected their friendship. The principal of Central High School stated "I just had hoped that I could show this picture and say, 'This happened, and that happened, and now…' and there is no 'now'." She added, "And that makes me sad. It makes me sad for them, it makes me sad for the future students at our school, and for the history books, because I'd like a happy ending. And we don't have that."

References

External links
Vanity Fair story on the desegregation of Little Rock Central High School

1942 births
Living people
Activists from Little Rock, Arkansas
People notable for being the subject of a specific photograph
Photographs of protests
21st-century American women